The Château des Rudel is a château in Blaye, Gironde, Nouvelle-Aquitaine, France.

Châteaux in Gironde
Monuments historiques of Gironde